Feuerwerker is a surname. Notable people with the surname include:
 Albert Feuerwerker (1927–2013), an American historian of modern China
 Antoinette Feuerwerker (1912–2003), French jurist and French Resistance fighter
 David Feuerwerker (1912–1980), Swiss-French rabbi, professor of Jewish history

See also 

Jewish surnames
German-language surnames